Oecologia is an international peer-reviewed English-language journal published by Springer since 1968 (some articles were published in German or French until 1976). The journal publishes original research in a range of topics related to plant and animal ecology.

Oecologia has an international focus and presents original papers, methods, reviews and special topics. Papers focus on population ecology, plant-animal interactions, ecosystem ecology, community ecology, global change ecology, conservation ecology, behavioral ecology and physiological ecology.

Oecologia had an impact factor of 3.298 (2021) and is ranked 37 out of 136 in the subject category "ecology".

Editorial Board 
As of December 2022, the journal has six editors in chief:
 Carlos L. Ballaré (plant-microbe/plant-animal interactions), University of Buenos Aires, Argentina
 Nina Farwig (terrestrial invertebrate ecology), University of Marburg, Germany
 Indrikis Krams (terrestrial vertebrate ecology), University of Latvia
 Russell K. Monson (plant physiological/ecosystem ecology), University of Colorado Boulder, US
 Melinda Smith (plant population/community ecology), Colorado State University, US
 Joel Trexler (aquatic ecology), Florida State University, US

References

External links 
 Oecologia

Ecology journals
English-language journals
Publications with year of establishment missing
Journals published between 13 and 25 times per year